Lermontov is the name of a Russian noble family of Scottish origin, descended from George Learmonth (who was known in Russia as ). The family legend has it that George Learmonth was a descendant of the famed 13th-century Scottish poet Thomas the Rhymer (also known as Thomas Learmonth).

Notable members 
George Learmonth (1590s–1633), poruchik in regiment of Captain-Rittmeister Jacob Shaw, during the Smolensk War (1632–1634). He was Rittmeister of the Moscouvite Reiters regiment of Charles d'Ebert, under command of Semen Prozorovsky. He died in battle with units of Field Hetman of Lithuania Krzysztof Radziwiłł in August 1633.
Mikhail Lermontov (1814–1841), was a Russian Romantic writer, poet and painter, sometimes called "the poet of the Caucasus", the most important Russian poet after Alexander Pushkin's death in 1837 and the greatest figure in Russian Romanticism. His influence on later Russian literature is still felt in modern times, not only through his poetry, but also through his prose, which founded the tradition of the Russian psychological novel. 
Julia Lermontova (1846–1919), was a Russian chemist. She is known as the first Russian female doctor in chemistry, and the third woman to have been given a doctorate in Europe. She studied at the University of Heidelberg and the University of Berlin before she received her doctorate by the University of Göttingen in 1874. She was inducted to the Russian Chemical Society in 1875.
 ( (1792–1866) was a Russian admiral who distinguished himself in the Finnish War (1808—1809) and the Crimean War.
Alexander Mikhailovich Lermontov (1838–1906) was an Imperial Russian division commander. He participated in the Russo-Turkish War (1877–1878).
, (born 1953 in Pyatigorsk), is a Russian public figure, doctor of Culturology, member of the Civic Chamber of the Russian Federation in 2014–2017.

Further reading
  "Георг Андреев Лермонтов, родоначальник русской ветви Лермонтовых", Москва, 1894 
 Tatiana Molchanova & Rex Learmonth  "LearmonthsLermontovs. Origin & History of the Surname and Families 1057–2007"         Russia & Great Britain, 2007 Copyrights are preserved at the Copyrights Office,  Library of Congress, Washington DC, USA, 2007, 434 pages.
 "Learmonth-Lermontov. A history of the name and families" by Tatiana Molchanova and Rex Learmonth

References

Russian noble families
Russian families of Scottish origin